The 2019 Bangsamoro autonomy plebiscite was a two-part plebiscite held in Mindanao, Philippines, that ratified the Bangsamoro Organic Law (BOL) and replaced the Autonomous Region in Muslim Mindanao (ARMM) with the Bangsamoro Autonomous Region in Muslim Mindanao (BARMM), as well as the scope of the said region.

Under the organic law, the government would have to hold the plebiscite not more than 150 days from the signing of the BOL into law (July 26, 2018) but not earlier than 90 days from the law's signing. The first part of the plebiscite was held on January 21, 2019, where voters from the ARMM voted in regards of the BOL's ratification and residents of Cotabato City and Isabela City voted for or against their cities' inclusion to the then-proposed region. The second part was held on February 6 to potentially expand the BARMM; with voters from six municipalities in Lanao del Norte and 67 barangays in Cotabato province voting for or against their localities' inclusion to the BARMM.

On January 25, 2019, the Commission on Elections (COMELEC) announced that the BOL was "deemed ratified" after results in the first part of the plebiscite showed majority support for the law's ratification. The election body also officially announced that majority of voters in Cotabato City voted in favor of joining the then-proposed autonomous region while voters of Isabela City rejected their inclusion. During the February 6 referendum, however, 63 of the 67 Cotabato barangays, and 9 of 22 towns in Lanao del Norte saw voters in favor of joining the then-proposed region. Despite the fact that the six municipalities in Lanao del Norte which petitioned to join were among the 9 voting in favor of inclusion, a majority of support was required from not only from voters in the individual municipality, but also from voters throughout the rest of the province as well. As a result, no municipality in Lanao del Norte joined the autonomous region. All of the barangays in Cotabato province which saw voters vote in favor of joining, however, joined the region as well.

Scope

Bangsamoro 'core' territory
Voters in localities referred to as the core territory of the proposed Bangsamoro Autonomous Region were eligible to participate in the plebiscite. The core territory covers:
Current territory of the Autonomous Region in Muslim Mindanao
Isabela City in Basilan
Cotabato City
6 municipalities in Lanao del Norte (*)  — Nunungan, Tangcal, Munai, Pantar, Balo-i and Tagoloan
39 barangays in North Cotabato (*)
Aleosan  (3)  — Dunguan, Lower Mingading and Tapodoc
Carmen (2) — Manarapan and Nasapian
Kabacan (3) — Nanga-an, Simbuhay and Sanggadong
Midsayap (12) — Damatulan, Kadigasan, Kadingilan, Kapinpilin, Kudarangan, Central Labas, Malingao, Mudseng, Nabalawag, Olandang, Sambulawan and Tugal
Pigcawayan (8) — Lower Baguer, Balacayon, Buricain, Datu Binasing, Kadingilan, Matilac, Patot and Lower Pangangkalan
Pikit (11) — Bangoinged, Balatican, S. Balong, S. Balongis, Batulawan, Buliok, Gokotan, Kabasalan, Lagunde, Macabual and Macasendeg
Voters in the whole provinces of Lanao del Norte and North Cotabato also had to vote if they consented to a locality's secession from their parent province to join the proposed Bangsamoro Autonomous Region.

Other areas
Additionally, adjacent local government units bordering the localities above could opt for inclusion in the plebiscite through their local governments or a petition by its registered voters. The Comelec released guidelines regarding this concern on October 22, 2018 and gave local government units seeking this course of action until October 31, 2018 to comply. Voters or the local government of the petitioning locality had to pay a  filing fee and a  research fee as imposed by the election body.

A total of 62 localities was initially announced to have made bids to participate in the plebiscite, although not all of them were contiguous to the defined Bangsamoro core territory. Fifty-six of these petitions were initiated by local governments while six were made by registered voters of the petitioning localities. The Comelec planned to decide on all of these petitions initially by mid-November 2018 but later moved their target to December 15, 2018. Due to the large number of petitions, the Comelec decided on December 7, 2018 to schedule the planned plebiscite on two separate dates (January 21 and February 6, 2019) stating that they could not process all petitions by December 15 with localities with successful petitions taking part in the February vote.

A total of 103 petitions were filed, but only 28 were accepted. Petitions not accepted were either due to the petitioning locality not being adjacent to the defined core territory of the proposed Bangsamoro Autonomous Region or failure to submit sufficient requirements for their bid to get included in the plebiscite. Voters from the 28 accepted barangays were permitted to participate in the February polling.

Approved additional areas
By early January 2019, the Comelec has approved the petition of 20 barangays in North Cotabato:

Aleosan (1) — Pagangan 
Carmen (5) — Pebpoluan, Kibayao, Kitulaan, Tupig, and Langogan
Pigcawayan (4) — Libungan Torreta, Pangankalan, Datu Mantil, and Simsiman 
Pikit (10) — Rajahmuda, Barungis, Gli-Gli, Nalapaan, Panicupan, Bualan, Nabundas, Nunguan, Manaulanan, and Bulol

On January 11, 2019, the Comelec announced the final list of additional participating localities for the plebiscite. The petitions of eight more barangays, all from North Cotabato, were approved by the election body.

Pikit (2) — Pamalian and Fort Pikit
Kabacan (4) — Pedtad, Buluan, Simone, and Tamped
Midsayap (1) — Tumbras
Tulunan (1) — Galidan

Unapproved petitions
At least twelve localities in Zamboanga del Sur filed petitions for their participation in the plebiscite. Three island barangays of Zamboanga City also reportedly filed petitions, a supposed move which was condemned by city mayor Maria Isabelle Climaco. The barangay captains of the three Zamboanga City barangays later denied filing petitions.

Preparations

Voters' registration
The Commission on Elections (Comelec) conducted a three-day satellite voter registration in select venues in the constituent provinces of the Autonomous Region in Muslim Mindanao as well as in the provinces of Lanao del Norte and North Cotabato, and in the cities of Cotabato and Isabela, Basilan from September 11 to 13, 2018. Alongside with voter's registration, residents were able to transfer, reactivate, or correct their registration, as well as have their records included or reinstated. Those who had registered for the most recent barangay and Sanggunian Kabataan elections were not required to undergo the registration process. Fifteen satellites centers were set by the Comelec, one of which was in a camp controlled by the rebel group Moro Islamic Liberation Front (MILF), which played a major part in the conception of the BOL. MILF members were also among those who registered for the plebiscite, some of whom lacked government-issued IDs such as birth certificates. Despite this, their own self-issued identification documents were accepted as valid IDs for the purpose of registration.

The Comelec recorded a total of 2,839,659 registered voters from 3,273 in certain areas in Mindanao and expected a 75% turn-out for the vote.

Campaign and plebiscite period

The campaign period for the Bangsamoro Autonomous Region creation plebiscite began on December 7, 2018 and ended on January 19, 2019, while the plebiscite period was scheduled to be held between December 7, 2018 to February 5, 2019. The voting for the plebiscite took place on January 21, 2019 as per an en banc decision by the Commission on Elections.

During the campaign period, a gun ban was imposed in localities set to participate in the plebiscite. During the same period, the following acts were also prohibited: the establishment of a new voting precinct or alteration of the territory of an existing one, the transfer or detail of officers and civil service employees, the organization and maintenance of "strike forces" or similar entities, and the suspension of any elective public official from the barangay to the provincial level including elective officials in independent cities.

The Comelec was also tasked to aid in holding information campaigns in every participating local government unit as well as allow the conduct of information dissemination and public advocacy events by other government agencies, non-government organizations and private individuals in relation to the plebiscite. Every barangay was also directed to hold at least one assembly during the campaign period informing constituents on matters regarding the BOL.

On January 6, 2019, a rally was organized in Jolo, Sulu as an expression of support to the ratification of the BOL which was attended by former Sulu governor Benjamin Loong as well as former and incumbent mayors of some of the towns of Sulu. Similar actions were planned in Basilan, Tawi-Tawi, and other parts of Sulu.

There was also reluctance or opposition against the ratification of the BOL. In Basilan, officials of Isabela City actively campaigned against their city's inclusion in the proposed region. ARMM Governor Mujiv Hataman allayed concerns of Christians living in the city regarding potential marginalization should their city become part of the new autonomous region reasoning that the neighboring town of Lamitan has been governed by Christians despite being part of the ARMM. Hataman also said that Christian practices such as fiestas and eating pork would not be made illegal should the BOL be ratified contrary to what people against the legislation is saying in their campaign. Basilan Governor Jim Hataman on his part claimed that the BOL is a "sure win" in his province. Meanwhile, Cotabato City Mayor Cynthia Guiani-Sayad expressed reservations on the potential inclusion of her city in the proposed region.

In Sulu, Governor Abdusakur Tan Sr. was against the ratification of the BOL and questioned the law's constitutionality at the Supreme Court. However, some Sulu leaders voiced support for the law.

The provincial government of Lanao del Norte campaigned for a "No" vote since it opposed the inclusion of six of its municipalities in the proposed Bangsamoro Autonomous Region. Lanao del Norte Governor Imelda Quibranza Dimaporo as well as her husband Abdullah and son Mohammad Khalid, who were both members of the House of Representatives lead the provincial government's campaign. Abdullah Makapaar, the leader of the Moro Islamic Liberation Front's North Western Mindanao Command, campaigned for a "Yes" vote – promising to double the salary of teachers and the establishment of orphanage centers in the province.

Question

The crafting of the questions to be use in the plebiscite by the Comelec was already being finalized by mid-September 2018.

In October 2018, it was reported that in the defined core territories of the proposed Bangsamoro Autonomous Region, voters will be asked to answer "Yes" or "No" if they approve the Bangsamoro Organic Law or not while in surrounding areas and non-core areas, voters will be presented a "two-folded" question.

The plebiscite questions were be in Arabic and Filipino; both languages were used in the existing Autonomous Region in Muslim Mindanao areas while only Filipino was used in the rest of the plebiscite's scope. No ballots with English questions were printed.

Voters in the existing ARMM had to answer one question:

In Filipino:

In Arabic:

English translation:

Voters in Basilan were asked whether they wanted to include the city of Isabela in the proposed Bangsamoro Autonomous Region in addition to the question above regarding their stance on the ratification of the BOL. The question was presented as follows:

In Filipino:

In Arabic:

English Translation:

Voters in the cities of Isabela and Cotabato were asked one question: whether or not they were in favor of their locality's inclusion in the proposed Bangsamoro Autonomous Region.

Organization

The Comelec held a simulation of the plebiscite on October 23, 2018 at its main office in Intramuros, Manila. Ballot printing started on December 7, 2018 and lasted for three days. Around 2.8 million ballots were printed.

The plebiscite was originally planned to be held at a single date on January 21, 2019. However the Comelec announced on December 7, 2018 that the plebiscite would be held in two separate days instead; on January 21 and February 6, 2019. The election body reasoned that the move was to allow the resolution of pending petitions for voluntary inclusion of additional local government units in the plebiscite.

Voters in the Autonomous Region in Muslim Mindanao including Cotabato City and Isabela City in Basilan would take part in the January 21 vote while the rest of the named participating localities in the BOL as well as additional localities which successfully petitioned for their inclusion would take part in the February 6 vote.

For both dates, the Comelec had allotted eight hours of voting. Voting was set to start at 8:00 a.m. (UTC+8) and close at 3:00 p.m. Voters within  of the polling area would still be allowed to vote past 3:00 p.m. Voting was to be done manually with the ballot containing questions answerable by "yes" or "no" in English or its equivalent in Filipino or any other indigenous Philippine languages. Answers made with any other mark such as a check, a cross, or a thumb mark were not accepted as valid.

At least 25 international observers were permitted to oversee the plebiscite in order to establish credibility of the plebiscite. A few restrictions and regulations were to be imposed such as the requirement for the observer to identify themselves to election authorities at the site and for them to provide copies of their report to the government. They would not be allowed to interfere in the process of the plebiscite itself. Their reports would also be used by the Comelec as a reference to improve the process of future elections and plebiscites.

Budget
It was estimated that the plebiscite would require . By mid-September 2018, the proposed national budget for 2019 still did not include the budget for the January 2019 plebiscite.

In an event that the Congress failed to appropriate part of the 2019 national budget for the holding of the plebiscite, it was proposed that funds acquired by Comelec in the 2018 barangay elections be used to partially satisfy the financial needs of the plebiscite.

By November 2018, budget for the plebiscite had been allocated. The Department of Budget and Management stated that the funds would be drawn from the fund allocation of the Comelec.

Legal challenges
Governor Abdusakur Tan II, the provincial governor of Sulu questioned the constitutionality of the Bangsamoro Organic Law before the Supreme Court of the Philippines through a petition filed in October 2018. He asked the high court to rule the BOL unconstitutional and for the stoppage of the planned plebiscite. According to the petition, the BOL which sought to replace the Autonomous Region in Muslim Mindanao with the Bangsamoro Autonomous Region was illegal, citing a view that the constitution provided for only one organic act for the establishment of an autonomous region in Muslim Mindanao. It also argued that only a constitutional amendment could legally abolish the ARMM and not legislation by the congress. In addition, it questioned the provision that the ARMM would be considered as "one geographical area" for the purpose of the plebiscite as well as the Moro Islamic Liberation Front's lead role in the Bangsamoro Transition Commission to the prejudice of other Muslims who are affiliated with other rebel groups and non-Muslims.

The Philippine Constitutional Association (Philconsa) also filed a similar petition against the BOL while an intervention was filed by the Philippine Association of Islamic Accountants (PAIA) seeking for the dismissal of the two petitions filed by the Philconsa and the Sulu provincial government. The two petitions were ordered to be consolidated by the Supreme Court on January 8, 2019. Associate Justice Mario Victor Leonen would handle the cases.

Opinion polling
The International Alert (IA) conducted a survey in the Autonomous Region in Muslim Mindanao with 614 respondents aged 18–35 regarding their position on the Bangsamoro Autonomous Region creation plebiscite. Of the respondents, 89.4 percent reported that they would vote in favor of the ratification of the Bangsamoro Organic Law, while 2.5 percent said that they would vote against; the rest were unsure. However, in the same survey, respondents in the Sulu archipelago were largely undecided compared to their counterparts in mainland Mindanao.

Results

Ratification of the BOL
On January 25, the Commission on Elections, as the National Plebiscite Board of Canvassers, declared the ratification of the Bangsamoro Organic Law creating the Bangsamoro Autonomous Region in Muslim Mindanao (BARMM), after a majority of votes from the present Autonomous Region in Muslim Mindanao (ARMM) approved its creation.

On the ratification of the BARMM from the then components of the ARMM, the entire ARMM voted as one; therefore, Sulu's rejection of the BARMM does not remove them from the BARMM.

Inclusion to the Bangsamoro Autonomous Region

Cotabato City and Isabela, Basilan

Residents of Cotabato City and Isabela City, the latter of which is part of Basilan province but not the ARMM, voted on January 21 regarding their inclusion in the proposed Bangsamoro Autonomous Region. Isabela being a part of Basilan province, the residents of the other towns of Basilan had to consent if they were in favor of Isabela's potential inclusion in the Bangsamoro Autonomous Region. Cotabato City, as an independent component city, only needed a majority of its voters to vote in favor or against.

On January 25, the Commission on Elections, as the National Plebiscite Board of Canvassers, announced that a majority of voters in Cotabato City voted in favor of inclusion in the BARMM. In Isabela City, a majority of voters rejected their city's inclusion in the proposed BARMM while a majority of voters in the rest of the province agreed to the potential inclusion. Lacking a double majority, Isabela remains a part of the Zamboanga Peninsula region.

Municipalities in Lanao del Norte
A majority of voters in the six Lanao del Norte towns voted in favor of their municipality's inclusion in the Bangsamoro, and in the cases of Munai and Tangcal, overwhelmingly, to join the BARMM.

Like in the case of Isabela in Basilan, the six towns' inclusion in the proposed Bangsamoro Autonomous Region also needed consent from the rest of the towns in Lanao del Norte. Each town needed to secure consent individually. The city of Iligan, a highly urbanized city not under the jurisdiction of Lanao del Norte, did not participate in the plebiscite.

The other towns in Lanao del Norte rejected to allow the towns petitioning to be a part of the BARMM from joining. Because of this, the six towns that voted in favor of their inclusion would not join the proposed region.

Barangays in Cotabato
 
Out of 67 barangays of Cotabato that were included in the plebiscite, 63 voted for inclusion. The four that rejected the measure were Galidan in Tulunan, Balatican in Pikit, and Pagangan and Lower Mingading in Aleosan; these four would not be joining the BARMM. Meanwhile, each municipality consented to its barangays in joining the BARMM. In Pikit, only one barangay that voted in the plebiscite declined to join. The 22 barangays that voted to join the BARMM included Barangay Fort Pikit, which was the site of the Municipal Hall. The municipal government declared that they would ask that the hall and adjacent plaza be annexed by neighboring Barangay Poblacion, one of the 20 barangays that are remaining in Cotabato.

The barangays in Aleosan and Tolonan voted in favor of their inclusion but majority of voters in the rest of their parent municipalities voted against the barangays' inclusion. Barangay Baltican in Pikit rejected their inclusion while the rest of Pikit consented the barangay's inclusion and would have been part of the new autonomous region if Baltican voters also voted for their inclusion.

Reactions to the results

To the January 21 vote
Discrepancies were noted regarding the actual number of votes cast in Cotabato City: a total of 39,027 votes were recorded but 6,682 "yes" votes were recorded and 24,994 "no" votes with the combined total of the yes and no votes at 61,676. The National Plebiscite Board of Canvassers ordered a re-tabulation of the votes from Cotabato City to validate the votes.

The mayor of Cotabato City, Guiani Sayaidi, was to file a protest because of the results. She alleged harassment of voters who were not supportive of the BOL and "flying voters" or non-residents voting in another precinct. Sayaidi later alleged a conspiracy between the national government and the MILF for the result of the plebiscite in her city. She said that the military did not respond to her pleas to disperse MILF members which she claimed were harassing voters and also mentioned an alleged detention of a barangay chief at the headquarters of the Philippine Army's 6th Infantry Division after being told to attend a seminar in relation to the plebiscite on the eve of the plebiscite voting date. The claim has been denied by the Armed Forces of the Philippines, and Sayaidi was told to bring the matter to a "proper forum".

Less than a week after the plebiscite, the Our Lady of Mount Carmel Cathedral in Jolo of Sulu Province was bombed on January 27, one inside the church and another outside after the first bombing when the armed forced responded. Around 18 people were killed, while 82 others were injured. The Armed Forces of the Philippines blamed the Ajang-Ajang group of the Abu Sayyaf as the perpetrators. Sulu narrowly rejected inclusion in the BARMM, but since the old ARMM voted for inclusion, Sulu could not opt out of inclusion. The military stated that it had received reports that the Abu Sayyaf, with foreign collaboration, had been planning to attack an urban area for a "long time" and insisted that it had yet to establish a connection between the bombings and the plebiscite itself.

The United Nations and the European Union acknowledged the Bangsamoro Organic Law and the result of the plebiscite as a significant achievement in the Mindanao peace process. The government of Turkey issued a statement with the same message, while Japan has pledged continued support for aiding developments in Mindanao in accordance with the peace process.

To the February 6 vote
Following unofficial results, that the majority of voters in Lanao del Norte voted against the inclusion of six municipalities of the province in the Bangsamoro Autonomous Region, the Philippine National Police decided to keep officers stationed in various parts of the province for election duties for the plebiscite to remain in anticipation of adverse reaction to the defeat of the "Yes" votes.

Aftermath

The Commission on Elections announced on January 25, 2019 that the BOL was "deemed ratified", which meant that the ARMM would be abolished and that the process of the formal establishment of the Bangsamoro Autonomous Region would begin. The election body also announced that Cotabato City would be part of this new autonomous region while Isabela City in Basilan, which was never part of the ARMM, would remain outside of the new autonomous region. The election body also confirmed on February 14, 2019, that all six Lanao del Norte municipalities which could then-potentially be part of the new region voted in favor of their inclusion but failed to gain approval from voters in other towns in the province. Sixty-three out of 67 barangays were also announced to form part of the proposed autonomous region after they verified that voters in this barangays voted in favor of their inclusion while the rest of the voters from their respective parent municipalities consented their inclusion.

The barangays that would be part of the BARMM did not immediately secede from their parent municipalities and province once the Bangsamoro Autonomous Region was effectively established. They were expected to vote for municipal officials of their parent municipalities and North Cotabato provincial officials in the 2019 Philippine general election in May if the barangays were not reorganized into a new municipality or merged with any of the neighboring municipalities of Maguindanao in time before the elections.

The members of an interim regional government of the Bangsamoro Autonomous Region, the Bangsamoro Transition Authority took their oaths on February 20, 2019 along with the ceremonial confirmation of the plebiscite results of both the January 21, and February 6, 2019 votes. The official turnover from the ARMM to the Bangsamoro Autonomous Region took place on February 25, 2019, thereby abolishing the Autonomous Region in Muslim Mindanao after 30 years of existence.

See also
1977 Southern Philippines autonomous region creation plebiscite, plebiscite that created two autonomous regions in Mindanao
1989 Autonomous Region in Muslim Mindanao creation plebiscite, plebiscite that created the ARMM
2001 Autonomous Region in Muslim Mindanao expansion and inclusion plebiscite, plebiscite that expanded the ARMM

References

2019 in the Philippines
Regional plebiscites in the Philippines
2019 referendums
Presidency of Rodrigo Duterte
January 2019 events in the Philippines
February 2019 events in the Philippines
History of Bangsamoro
Autonomy referendums